Carey Hannah Mulligan (born 28 May 1985) is an English actress. She has received various accolades, including a British Academy Film Award, in addition to nominations for two Academy Awards, three Golden Globe Awards, and a Tony Award.

Mulligan made her professional acting debut on stage in Kevin Elyot's play Forty Winks (2004) at the Royal Court Theatre. She made her film debut with a supporting role in Joe Wright's romantic drama Pride & Prejudice (2005), followed by diverse roles in television, including the drama series Bleak House (2005), the television film Northanger Abbey (2007), and a guest appearance in Doctor Who, where she played Sally Sparrow. She made her Broadway debut in the revival of Anton Chekhov's The Seagull (2008), which earned her a Drama Desk Award nomination.

Mulligan's breakthrough role came as a 1960s schoolgirl in the coming-of-age film An Education (2009), for which she won the BAFTA Award for Best Actress in a Leading Role, and received a nomination for the Academy Award for Best Actress. She gained further acclaim for her performances in Never Let Me Go (2010), Drive (2011), Shame (2011), The Great Gatsby (2013), Inside Llewyn Davis (2013), Far from the Madding Crowd (2015), Suffragette (2015), Mudbound (2017), Wildlife (2018), and She Said (2022). For her performance in the Broadway revival of David Hare's Skylight (2015), she was nominated for the Tony Award for Best Actress in a Play, and for her portrayal of a vigilante in the black comedy Promising Young Woman (2020), Mulligan received her second Academy Award nomination.

Mulligan has been an ambassador for the Alzheimer's Society since 2012, and an ambassador for War Child since 2014. She has been married to singer-songwriter Marcus Mumford since 2012. They have two children.

Early life and education 
Carey Hannah Mulligan was born on 28 May 1985 in London, to Nano (née Booth) and Stephen Mulligan. Her father, a hotel manager, is of Irish descent and is originally from Liverpool. Her mother, a university lecturer, is from Llandeilo, Wales. Her parents met while they were both working in a hotel in their twenties.

When Mulligan was three, her father's hotel manager work took the family to Germany. While living there, she and her brother attended the International School of Düsseldorf. When she was eight, she and her family moved back to the UK. As a teenager, she was educated at Woldingham School, an independent school in Surrey.

Her interest in acting sparked from watching her brother perform in a school production of The King and I when she was six. During rehearsals, she pleaded with his teachers to let her be in the play. They let her join the chorus. While enrolled in Woldingham School as a teen, she was heavily involved in theatre. She was the student head of the drama department there, performing in plays and musicals, conducting workshops with younger students, and helping put on productions.

When she was 16, she attended a production of Henry V starring Kenneth Branagh. His performance emboldened her and reinforced her belief that she wanted to pursue a career in acting. She wrote a letter to Branagh asking him for advice. "I explained that my parents didn't want me to act, but that I felt it was my vocation in life," she said. Branagh's sister replied: "Kenneth says that if you feel such a strong need to be an actress, you must be an actress."

Mulligan's parents disapproved of her acting ambitions and wished for her to attend a university like her brother. At age 17, she applied to three London drama schools instead of the universities she was expected to apply to, but was not invited to attend them. During her final year at Woldingham School, actor/screenwriter Julian Fellowes delivered a lecture at the school on the production of the film Gosford Park. Mulligan briefly talked to him after the lecture and asked him for advice on an acting career. Fellowes tried to dissuade her from the profession and suggested she "marry a lawyer" instead. Undeterred, she later sent Fellowes a letter in which she stated she was serious about acting and that it was her purpose in life.

Several weeks later, Fellowes's wife Emma invited Mulligan to a dinner she and her husband were hosting for young aspiring actors. It facilitated an introduction between Mulligan and a casting assistant that led to an audition for a role in Pride and Prejudice. She auditioned three times, and was eventually given the role of Kitty Bennet. During her late teens and early twenties, she worked as a pub barmaid and an errand-runner for Ealing Studios between acting jobs.

Career

2004–2008: Early work
In 2004 Mulligan made her stage debut in the play Forty Winks at the Royal Court Theatre in London. She made her film debut the following year in Joe Wright's 2005 film adaptation of the Jane Austen novel Pride & Prejudice, portraying Kitty Bennet alongside Keira Knightley. Later that year, she won the role of orphan Ada Clare in the BAFTA award-winning BBC adaption of Charles Dickens' Bleak House, her television debut.

Among her 2007 projects were My Boy Jack, starring Daniel Radcliffe, another Jane Austen adaptation, Northanger Abbey, starring Felicity Jones, and the Doctor Who episode "Blink", which won her the Constellation Award for Best Female Performance in a 2007 Science Fiction Television Episode. She rounded out 2007 by appearing in an acclaimed stage revival of The Seagull, in which she played Nina alongside Kristin Scott Thomas and Chiwetel Ejiofor. The Guardian called her performance "quite extraordinarily radiant and frank." While in the middle of the production, she had to have an appendectomy, preventing her from being able to perform for a week. For her debut Broadway performance in the 2008 American transfer of The Seagull, she was nominated for a Drama Desk Award, but lost to Angela Lansbury for Blithe Spirit.

2009–2014: Breakthrough and critical success

Her big breakthrough came when, at 24, she was cast in her first leading role as Jenny in the 2009 independent film An Education, directed by Danish filmmaker Lone Scherfig and written by Nick Hornby. Over a hundred actresses auditioned for the part, but Mulligan's audition impressed Scherfig the most. The film and her performance received rave reviews, and she was nominated for an Academy Award, Screen Actors Guild, Golden Globe, Critics Choice and won a BAFTA Award. Lisa Schwarzbaum of Entertainment Weekly and Todd McCarthy of Variety both compared her performance to that of Audrey Hepburn. Rolling Stone's Peter Travers described her as having given a "sensational, starmaking performance," Mulligan was the recipient of the BAFTA Rising Star Award nomination, which is voted on by the British public.

In 2010, she was invited to join the Academy of Motion Picture Arts and Sciences, 
That same year she starred in the film adaptation of Kazuo Ishiguro's acclaimed novel Never Let Me Go with Keira Knightley, and Andrew Garfield. She won a British Independent Award for her performance. 
That same year she starred in the Oliver Stone-directed film Wall Street: Money Never Sleeps. Screened out of competition at the 2010 Cannes Film Festival, it was her first major studio project. Later that year she also provided vocals for the song "Write About Love" by Belle & Sebastian.

She returned to the stage in the Atlantic Theater Company's off-Broadway play adaptation of Ingmar Bergman's Through a Glass, Darkly, from 13 May – 3 July 2011. Mulligan played the central character, a mentally unstable woman, and received glowing praise from reviewers. Ben Brantley, theater critic for The New York Times, wrote that Mulligan's performance was "acting of the highest order"; he also described her as "extraordinary" and "one of the finest actresses of her generation."

Mulligan co-starred in two critically acclaimed films in 2011. The first being Nicolas Winding Refn's
Drive, with Ryan Gosling. The second film was Steve McQueen's sex-addiction drama Shame alongside Michael Fassbender Both films were major film festival hits. Drive debuted at 2011 Cannes Film Festival and Shame debuted at 2011 Venice Film Festival, both to rave reviews. She was nominated for her second BAFTA award—Best Supporting Actress—for the film Drive which also garnered a total of 4 BAFTA award nominations, including Best Picture and Best Director. For her performance in Shame, she received critical praise as well as a British Independent Film Award nomination for Best Supporting Actress.

In 2013, she starred as Daisy Buchanan in Baz Luhrmann's The Great Gatsby opposite Leonardo DiCaprio, which was released in May 2013. Mulligan auditioned for the role of Daisy in late 2010. While attending a Vogue fashion dinner in New York City in November, Baz Luhrmann’s wife, Catherine Martin, told her she had the part. In May 2012, she was a co-chair, alongside Anna Wintour, for the 2012 Met Ball Gala themed Schiaparelli and Prada: Impossible Conversations. In 2013, she also starred in Joel and Ethan Coen's black comedy Inside Llewyn Davis alongside Oscar Isaac, and Justin Timberlake. The film premiered at the Cannes Film Festival to rave reviews.

In 2014, she starred in the London revival of the play Skylight with Bill Nighy and Matthew Beard, directed by Stephen Daldry, at Wyndham's Theatre in London's West End. It won the 2014 Evening Standard Theatre Award for Revival of the Year and was nominated for the 2014 Olivier Award for Best Revival. 
She followed the production when it transferred to Broadway at the John Golden Theatre in April 2015.
The transfer was a massive success. The play won the Tony Award for Best Revival and she earned her first Tony Award nomination for Best Performance by a Leading Actress in a Play.

2015–present: Continued acclaim
Mulligan has continued to earn acclaim for her portrayal of a wide range of complex characters. In 2015, Mulligan was praised for her roles in two acclaimed films released that year. She starred in Thomas Vinterberg's film adaptation of Thomas Hardy's novel Far from the Madding Crowd with Matthias Schoenaerts, Tom Sturridge, and Michael Sheen, as well as Sarah Gavron's Suffragette with Helena Bonham Carter, Ben Whishaw, Brendan Gleeson and Meryl Streep.

In 2017, she starred in Netflix's Mudbound, directed by Dee Rees. The film was met with critical acclaim. On review aggregator Rotten Tomatoes, the film has an approval rating of 97% with the consensus reading, "Mudbound offers a well-acted, finely detailed snapshot of American history whose scenes of rural class struggle resonate far beyond their period setting." The film earned four Academy Award nominations including Best Adapted Screenplay for Rees.

In 2018, she starred in Paul Dano's directorial debut film Wildlife with Jake Gyllenhaal. The film was written by Dano and Zoe Kazan, and is an adaptation of Richard Ford’s novel of the same name. The film debuted at the 71st Cannes Film Festival and received rave reviews from critics. The film has earned a 94% on Rotten Tomatoes with the consensus reading, "Wildlife's portrait of a family in crisis is beautifully composed by director Paul Dano – and brought brilliantly to life by a career-best performance from Carey Mulligan." For her performance, Mulligan received an Independent Spirit Award nomination for Best Actress.

Mulligan stepped back into television as a Detective Inspector in Collateral, a BBC Two limited series, receiving plaudits from American and British critics. Mulligan praised creator Sir David Hare for seamlessly accommodating her pregnancy into the script.

Mulligan appeared off Broadway in the solo show, Girls and Boys at the Minetta Lane Theatre. The show was written by Dennis Kelly and directed by Lyndsey Turner. Her performance was praised, with The New York Times calling it "perfection". While promoting the show on Stephen Colbert's Late Show with Stephen Colbert, Mulligan described being injured while the curtain was going down. Bradley Cooper, who was in the audience, visited her backstage and carried her to urgent care.

In 2020, Mulligan starred in Emerald Fennell's black comedy thriller film Promising Young Woman, alongside Bo Burnham and Alison Brie. She also served as an executive producer on the film, which debuted at the 2020 Sundance Film Festival to great acclaim. The website Rotten Tomatoes lists the film's rating as 90%, with a critics consensus reading, "A boldly provocative, timely thriller, Promising Young Woman is an auspicious feature debut for writer-director Emerald Fennell — and a career highlight for Carey Mulligan." Due to the COVID-19 pandemic the film's release was delayed to 25 December 2020. For her performance, she received her second Academy Award nomination for Best Actress and won the Critics' Choice Movie Award for Best Actress among many other honours. After winning Best Female Lead at the 36th Independent Spirit Awards, Mulligan dedicated her award to the late Helen McCrory.

In 2021, Mulligan replaced Nicole Kidman in The Dig, a film about the events of the 1939 excavation of Sutton Hoo, co-starring Ralph Fiennes and Lily James. It received a limited release in the United Kingdom, followed by a streaming release via Netflix. The following year, Mulligan portrayed Megan Twohey, one of the real life New York Times reporters who broke the Harvey Weinstein scandal, in  Maria Schrader's She Said, based on the book of the same name.  For her performance, Mulligan received a Golden Globe nomination for Best Supporting Actress.

Upcoming projects
Mulligan will star as Felicia Montealegre in Bradley Cooper's directorial Maestro, a biopic based on the life of Leonard Bernstein, alongside Cooper and Jeremy Strong. The film is set to be released on Netflix in 2023. She will also star with Adam Sandler in Netflix's adaptation of the science fiction novel Spaceman of Bohemia, directed by Johan Renck. In addition, she will have a voice role in the stop motion animated feature Wildwood, based on the fantasy novel of the same name.

Personal life
Mulligan is married to Marcus Mumford, the lead singer of Mumford & Sons. They were childhood pen pals who lost touch and reconnected as adults. A few weeks after completing production on the film Inside Llewyn Davis, in which they were both involved, they married on 21 April 2012.
They have two children.

Philanthropy
Aside from acting, Mulligan was among the actresses who took part in the Safe Project—each was photographed in the place she feels safest—for a 2010 series to raise awareness of sex trafficking. She donated the Vionnet gown she wore at the 2010 BAFTAs to the Curiosity Shop, which sells its donations to raise money for charity.

Mulligan became the ambassador of the Alzheimer's Society in 2012, with the goal of raising awareness and research funding for Alzheimers and dementia. Her grandmother lived with Alzheimer's disease for the final 17 years of her life, during which she no longer recognised Mulligan. She helped host and participated in the 2012 Alzheimer's Society Memory Walk and was one of the sponsored Alzheimer's Society runners in the 2013 Nike Run to the Beat half-marathon in London.

In 2014, Mulligan became an ambassador for the charity War Child and visited the Democratic Republic of Congo in this role.

Acting credits

Film

Television

Stage

Discography

Awards and nominations

See also
 List of British Academy Award nominees and winners
List of actors with Academy Award nominations
List of actors with two or more Academy Award nominations in acting categories

References

External links

 
 
 
 

1985 births
21st-century English actresses
Actresses from London
Audiobook narrators
Best Actress BAFTA Award winners
English expatriates in the United States
English film actresses
English health activists
English people of Irish descent
English people of Welsh descent
English radio actresses
English stage actresses
English television actresses
English voice actresses
Living people
People educated at Woldingham School
Sexual abuse victim advocates
WFTV Award winners
Independent Spirit Award for Best Female Lead winners